Masicera is a genus of parasitic flies in the family Tachinidae. There are more than 50 described species in Masicera.

Species
These 58 species belong to the genus Masicera:

 Masicera aenescens Macquart, 1851
 Masicera alacris (Walker, 1861)
 Masicera angusta Macquart, 1851
 Masicera arcuatipennis (Macquart, 1855)
 Masicera auriceps Macquart, 1851
 Masicera aurifrons (Doleschall, 1858)
 Masicera bilineata (Wulp, 1890)
 Masicera brasiliensis (Moreira, 1915)
 Masicera bremii Macquart, 1851
 Masicera brevis Macquart, 1851
 Masicera caffrea (Macquart, 1846)
 Masicera campestris Robineau-Desvoidy, 1863
 Masicera clausa Perris, 1852
 Masicera consobrina Macquart, 1851
 Masicera cubensis (Macquart, 1848)
 Masicera cylindrica Perris, 1852
 Masicera declivicornis Macquart, 1851
 Masicera disputans (Walker, 1861)
 Masicera dumetorum Macquart, 1851
 Masicera exigua Perris, 1852
 Masicera expergita (Walker, 1861)
 Masicera facialis Robineau-Desvoidy, 1863
 Masicera flavescens Macquart, 1851
 Masicera flavidipennis Macquart, 1851
 Masicera flavifacies (Bigot, 1889)
 Masicera gentica (Walker, 1861)
 Masicera glauca (Giglio-Tos, 1893)
 Masicera guttata (Walker, 1858)
 Masicera hannomensis Macquart, 1851
 Masicera inclinans (Walker, 1858)
 Masicera interrupta Macquart, 1851
 Masicera latipennis Macquart, 1851
 Masicera major Macquart, 1851
 Masicera micans Macquart, 1851
 Masicera morio (Doleschall, 1858)
 Masicera necopina (Walker, 1861)
 Masicera nigrita Robineau-Desvoidy, 1863
 Masicera nitida Macquart, 1851
 Masicera normula (Wulp, 1890)
 Masicera palpalis Perris, 1852
 Masicera pavoniae (Robineau-Desvoidy, 1830)
 Masicera pumila Meigen, 1838
 Masicera quadrimaculata Robineau-Desvoidy, 1863
 Masicera ruficornis Macquart, 1851
 Masicera sendis Meigen, 1838
 Masicera sesquiplex (Giglio-Tos, 1893)
 Masicera silvatica (Fallen, 1810)
 Masicera similis (Macquart, 1851)
 Masicera socia Macquart, 1851
 Masicera sphingivora (Robineau-Desvoidy, 1830)
 Masicera strigata (Wulp, 1890)
 Masicera subpilosa (Wulp, 1890)
 Masicera tessellata Macquart, 1851
 Masicera trichoneura (Wulp, 1890)
 Masicera unicolor Macquart, 1851
 Masicera usta (Giglio-Tos, 1893)
 Masicera varipes (Macquart, 1846)
 Masicera virescens Macquart, 1851

References

Further reading

 
 
 
 

Tachinidae
Articles created by Qbugbot